Edwin Tenney Brewster (October 11, 1866 – March 14, 1960) was an American physicist and popular science writer.

Early life 
He was born on October 11, 1866, in Lawrence, Massachusetts, United States.

He died on March 14, 1960, in Brownfield, Oxford County, Maine.

Personal life 
His parents were John Leander Brewster and Adaline "Ada" Augusta Tenney.

He was married to Lillian Edna Dodge and had three children.

Education 
He completed his bachelor's degree from Harvard College in 1890. He completed his master's degree from Harvard College in 1891.

Career 
He worked as a science teacher at these schools:

 Brewster Academy

 Phillips Academy

He authored a large number of books, most notably the Natural Wonders Every Child Should Know.

Bibliography 
His notable books include: 

 Natural wonders every child should know
 The Understanding of Religion
 Life and Letters of Josiah Dwight Whitney
 The Nutrition of a Household
 Vocational Guidance for the Professions
 This Puzzling Planet: An Introduction to Geology

References

External links 
 Natural wonders every child should know
 Bibliography
 Project Gutenberg
 Internet Archive

1866 births
1960 deaths
19th-century American physicists
Harvard College alumni